Katrovozh or Sobskiye (Russian: Катровож) is a village along the Ob river in Yamalo-Nenets Autonomous Okrug, Russia with a subarctic Köppen climate classification and record high temperatures of 34 °C compared to record low temperatures of -50 °C. Katrovozh's population has decreased from 824 in 2002 to 779 in 2019 and its population is connected to the outside world via flights to Salekhard.

References 

Rural localities in Yamalo-Nenets Autonomous Okrug